The Journal of Slavic Military Studies is a quarterly peer-reviewed academic journal that publishes articles relating to military affairs of Central and Eastern European Slavic nations, including their history and geopolitics, as well as book reviews. It is published by Routledge and the editor-in-chief is Martijn Lak. It was established in 1988 by David Glantz as  The Journal of Soviet Military Studies, obtaining its current title in 1993. David Glantz was editor-in-chief from the founding of the journal until the end of 2017, with Alexander Hill briefly editing the journal from January 2018-March 2019.

As of 2014, it is ranked in the first quartile of the SCImago Journal Rank of scholarly journals in the history category.

Abstracting and indexing 
The journal is abstracted and indexed in:

References

External links 
 

English-language journals
International relations journals
Military journals
Publications established in 1988
Quarterly journals
Taylor & Francis academic journals
Routledge academic journals